Allar is an Estonian-language male given name.

People named Allar include:
 Allar Jõks (born 1965), Estonian lawyer and the former Chancellor of Justice
 Allar Levandi (born 1965), Estonian nordic combined skier 
 Allar Raja (born 1983), Estonian rower

References

Estonian masculine given names